The Anyuy Mountains (Anyuyskiy Khrebet), also known as South Anyuy Range are a range of mountains in far north-eastern Russia. Administratively the range is part of the Chukotka Autonomous Okrug, Russia. The area of the range is largely uninhabited.

Geography
To the north rises the Chuvanay Range and to the northeast the Ilirney Range, on the other side of the Maly Anyuy River. The Anyuy Range is part of the East Siberian System of mountains and is one of the subranges of the Anadyr Highlands. To the east of the eastern end of the range rises the Shchuchy Range, stretching in a roughly southwestern direction, and to the south of the range rises the roughly parallel Oloy Range of the Kolyma Mountains.
 
Although there are no glaciers in the range in present times, there is evidence of ancient glaciation. The Anyuy Range is drained by rivers Maly Anyuy, Bolshoy Anyuy, and Omolon.

In 1952 a volcano was discovered in the southern part of the range following examination of aerial images. The volcano was named Anyuyskiy.

Flora
There are sparse forests of larch in river valleys and the mountain slopes are covered with tundra vegetation, with rocky mountain tundra on the ridges and peaks.

See also
Anyuyskiy
Kupol Gold Mine

References

External links
In the Anyuy Volcano (На Анюйском вулкане) basov_chukotka — LiveJournal

Mountain ranges of Chukotka Autonomous Okrug